Tadamon Zouk is a Lebanese sports club most known for its basketball program. It is located in Zouk Mikael, Kesrouan, Lebanon.

Tadamon Zouk basketball team is part of the Lebanese Basketball League. It was part of the league's top division for many years and a regular feature of the Final Four teams in league, but has been relegated for some time but are now back to play in the 1st division.

Tadamon Zouk have had a rich history, with many of the greatest players in LBL history having played for the organization, including Wyking Jones and Tony Madison.

History
Tadamon Zouk is a Lebanese sports club established in 1954 most known for its basketball program. It is located at Zouk Mikael, Kesrouan, Lebanon.
Tadamon Zouk basketball team is part of the Lebanese Basketball League. It was part of the league's top division for many years and a regular feature of the Final Four teams in league, but has been relegated to play in the 2nd division.

Tadamon Zouk was once nicknamed "The Unlucky Team", and "the runner-up champion" due to his participation in three consecutive championship finals from 1997–1999, losing against Sporting Club 3–1 in 1997, then 3–2 and 3–0 respectively in 1998 and 1999. Tadamon also reached the Lebanese basketball Cup final in 2000, losing to Sagesse as well. 
After the 2012–2013 season, Tadamon Zouk was promoted back to the 1st division after 10 seasons of being out.

Their 2014–2015 season ended when Byblos knocked them out in the Quarterfinal Play-offs 4–0, when the prominent players sat out due to being unpaid for several months due to economic difficulty. In 2015–2016, they were knocked out by Sagesse 3–1 in the Quarterfinals as well.

Players

Current roster

Depth chart

Notable players

  Maurice Kemp

References

Basketball teams in Lebanon
Basketball teams established in 1954
1954 establishments in Lebanon